The Seven Military Classics were seven important military texts of ancient China, which also included Sun-tzu's The Art of War. The texts were canonized under this name during the 11th century AD, and from the time of the Song dynasty, were included in most military leishu.  For imperial officers, either some or all of the works were required reading to merit promotion, like the requirement for all bureaucrats to learn and know the work of Confucius.

There were many anthologies with different notations and analyses by scholars throughout the centuries leading up to the present versions in Western publishing.  The Kangxi Emperor of the Qing dynasty commented on the seven military classics, stating, "I have read all of the seven books, among them there are some materials that are not necessarily right and there are superstitious stuff can be used by bad people."  

Members of the Chinese Communist Party also studied the texts during the Chinese Civil War as well as many European and American military minds.

Emperor Shenzong (宋神宗), the sixth emperor of the Song dynasty, determined which texts would compose this anthology in 1080.

List
According to Ralph D. Sawyer and Mei-chün Sawyer, who created one of the latest translations, the Seven Military Classics include the following texts:
 Jiang Ziya (Taigong)'s Six Secret Teachings (六韜)
 The Methods of the Sima (司馬法) (also known as Sima Rangju Art of War)
 Sun Tzu's The Art of War (孫子兵法)
 Wu Qi's Wuzi (吳子)
 Wei Liaozi (尉繚子)
 Three Strategies of Huang Shigong (黃石公三略)
 Questions and Replies between Tang Taizong and Li Weigong (唐太宗李衛公問對)

There are no other known variations of the Seven Military Classics anthology with alternating members but the constituent works themselves have had many multiple versions, especially The Art of War, which has had at least several dozen different translations to English in the 20th Century alone.

Despite prominence of military texts in the Yi Zhou shu, none of the anthology chapters were regarded as classics.

References

External links
 Read the Seven Military Classics at Internet Archive

 
Chinese classic texts
Chinese military texts
Series of Chinese books